Shahrak-e Aliabad (also Romanized as Shahrak-e ‘Alīābād) is a village in Gabrik Rural District, in the Central District of Jask County, Hormozgan Province, Iran. At the 2006 census, its population was 159, in 35 families.

References 

Populated places in Jask County